Page and Plant (also known as Jimmy Page & Robert Plant) were an English rock band active between 1994 and 1998. The group consisted of guitarist Jimmy Page and vocalist Robert Plant (both formerly of English rock band Led Zeppelin), accompanied by bassist Charlie Jones and drummer Michael Lee. Formed in 1994 for an MTV Unplugged reunion, Page and Plant released the platinum-selling live album No Quarter, featuring both new material and middle eastern-influenced covers of classic Led Zeppelin songs. Following the success of the live album, they embarked on a world tour featuring a full orchestra.

In 1998, Page and Plant released Walking into Clarksdale, comprising entirely new material and featuring the Grammy Award-winning single "Most High". Following the album's release, they embarked on a second world tour before disbanding at the end of 1998. The band reunited for a final performance in 2001.

History
The initial plans for a reunion were made in 1993, with discussions between the two of collaborating emerging from casual small talk and then an invitation to perform on MTV Unplugged. Music producer Bill Curbishley, who had been managing Plant since the 1980s and who assumed management of Page in 1994, was integral in the reuniting of Page and Plant. Despite failed attempts by others to reunite the pair, Curbishley was able to persuade the previously reluctant Plant into working with Page again. In an interview he gave in 2004, Page recounted the background:

Plant's recollection of the reunion was as follows:

MTV Unplugged, No Quarter, and Unledded World Tour (1994–1997) 

Led Zeppelin's main songwriters reformed on 17 April 1994 as a part of the Alexis Korner Memorial Concert at Buxton, England. On 25 and 26 August they taped performances in London, Wales, and Morocco with Egyptian and Moroccan orchestration of several Led Zeppelin tunes along with four new songs. The performances aired on 12 October, and were so successful that the two coordinated a tour which kicked off in February 1995. The Unplugged performance was released as an album in November 1994 as No Quarter: Jimmy Page and Robert Plant Unledded.

Page and Plant's touring line-up included Charlie Jones on bass and percussion, Michael Lee on drums, plus Pearl Thompson (of The Cure fame, then credited as "Porl Thompson") on guitar and banjo, Najma Akhtar providing backup vocals, Jim Sutherland on mandolin and bodhrán, Nigel Eaton playing the hurdy-gurdy, and Ed Shearmur adding Hammond organ with orchestral arrangements. Page spoke fondly of the lineup, stating:

The band, joined by keyboardist Phil Andrews, recorded a cover of "Rude World" by Rainer Ptacek for the 1997 charity album The Inner Flame: A Tribute to Rainer Ptacek.

Walking into Clarksdale and Walking into Everywhere World Tour (1998) 
In 1998, Page and Plant entered the studio to record Walking into Clarksdale. The album, recorded and mixed by engineer Steve Albini, featured the single "Most High", which won the Grammy Award for Best Hard Rock Performance. Walking into Clarksdale was certified gold with over 500,000 copies sold. Despite the critical acclaim for "Most High", the album received mixed reviews from critics and was not as commercially successful as 1994's platinum-certified No Quarter.

To promote Walking into Clarksdale, Page and Plant embarked on a world tour consisting of 97 tour dates in North America and Europe. Their concert in Bucharest, Romania was professionally filmed and aired live on MTV for the special "Live from the 10 Spot".

Dissolution and Final Performance (1998–2001) 

After the 1998 supporting tour for Walking into Clarksdale, Robert Plant left to focus on other projects, dissolving the reunion. The pair briefly reunited for a final performance in 2001 at the Montreux Jazz Festival.

In a 2005 interview with Uncut magazine, Plant attributed his decision to dissatisfaction with the production on Walking Into Clarksdale, along with a desire to "get back to playing clubs":

Page later revealed that he had written songs for a follow-up studio album, stating:

Members
Jimmy Page – acoustic and electric guitar, mandolin, production
Robert Plant – vocals, production
Charlie Jones – bass, percussion
Michael Lee – drums, percussion

Additional personnel
Porl Thompson – guitar, banjo
Nigel Eaton – hurdy-gurdy
Ed Shearmur – orchestral arrangements, organ
Lynton Naiff – string arrangements
Jim Sutherland – mandolin, bodhran
Tim Whelan – keyboards
Phil Andrews – mixing, keyboards
Martin Meissonnier – pre-production

Discography
Albums

Contributions to compilations

Singles

Videos

See also
Coverdale–Page

References

English rock music groups
Led Zeppelin
Grammy Award winners
Rock music duos
Jimmy Page
Robert Plant
Musical groups established in 1994
Musical groups disestablished in 1998
Musical groups from London
Mercury Records artists
Atlantic Records artists
Fontana Records artists
Musical quartets
English musical duos
Male musical duos
Songwriting teams